Mordellistena corporaali is a beetle in the genus Mordellistena of the family Mordellidae. It was described in 1925 by Píc.

References

corporaali
Beetles described in 1925